Charles Dudley is the name of:

 Charles E. Dudley (1780–1841), American politician
 Charles Benjamin Dudley (1842–1909), American chemist
 Charles Dudley (actor) (1883–1952), American actor and studio make-up artist
 Charles Dudley (basketball) (born 1950), American basketball player
 Doc Dudley (Charles Arthur Dudley Jr., 1894–1975), American baseball player